The e caudata (Latin for "tailed e", from  — "tail"; sometimes also called the e cedilla, hooked e, or looped e) is a modified form of the letter E that is usually graphically represented in printed text as E with ogonek (ę) but has a distinct history of usage. It was used in Latin from as early as the sixth century to represent the vowel also written ae or æ. In old Gaelic texts from the 13th century, it represented an ea ligature.

In Middle and Early Modern Irish manuscripts, and in unnormalised transcriptions of them, e caudata is used for e, ae, and ea.

In a few texts in Old Norse, it represents short , the result of i-mutation of Proto-Germanic , and contrasts with e, which represents Proto-Germanic .

Latin

The use of the e caudata in medieval Latin manuscripts, like the use of the ligature æ, was a transitional stage in the gradual change from representing the diphthong ae with the separate letters ae, as it was written throughout antiquity, to representing it with the letter e. It probably originated as a modified form of the ligature æ with only the lower loop and not the upper line of the a drawn attached to the e, as in medieval manuscripts the diacritic below the e is sometimes drawn as a loop, similar in shape to the loop of the a in æ in some scripts, rather than as an ogonek.

The e caudata first appears in a few uncial and half uncial manuscripts of the 6th century AD and was first used widely in 7th century Italian and Spanish uncial manuscripts; its use spread to Germany and the British Isles in the late 7th and early 8th centuries and to France in the late 8th century. In manuscripts of the 7th and 8th centuries, ae, æ, and ę are all common. By the 10th century the e caudata had mostly replaced the digraph ae, and it remained the most common way of representing the phoneme ae until the 12th century. However, its use remained uneven, as it was used less frequently in texts which used fewer abbreviations for the sake of greater clarity or formality, such as those written in Carolingian minuscule. E-caudata-like diacritics were also sometimes used on ligatures including an e; for instance, the letters aet were sometimes represented by an ampersand with a loop or hook under it, or the letters quae by the abbreviation for que with a loop or hook under it. In the 12th century, the e caudata started to be replaced by the plain e, which from then until the Renaissance remained the most common way of representing the phoneme ae in manuscripts.

In the Renaissance, the e caudata, along with the ligature æ and the digraph ae, was reintroduced by humanists as part of an attempt to return to a more classical writing system, since they believed that the 11th and 12th century manuscripts they read were actually ancient Roman. The e caudata was introduced on this basis by Coluccio Salutati and was used frequently in humanist minuscule and occasionally in Gothic script during the Renaissance.

References

External links
 CELT, a corpus of Celtic texts

Latin-script ligatures
Latin letters with diacritics
Old Norse
Palaeographic letters
Vowel letters

de:Ę